Hil Mosi (1885-1933) was an Albanian politician and poet.

Biography 

Hil Mosi, son of Mark Mosi, was born in Shkodër, then part of the Ottoman Empire, in 1885. He attended an Italian elementary school and later the Xavierian Shkodër Jesuit College before studying from 1904 to 1908 in Klagenfurt, southern Austria in order to become a teacher. In 1911, he took part in the Albanian uprising of northern Albania against Montenegro and the Ottoman Empire. In 1916 he became a member of the Albanian Literary Commission, and in 1920 a member of the Albanian delegation in the League of Nations. He was also a deputy of Shkodër from 1920 to 1924.

In 1924, Mosi was one of the main supporters of the revolution that overthrew the regime of Ahmet Zogu and established a democratic government. Fan S. Noli became the new Prime Minister, while Mosi served as a prefect of Korçë and Gjirokastër. After the restoration of Zog's regime he was initially exiled but returned to Albania in 1927 after amnesty was proclaimed and served anew in the government as minister of public works. In 1928, he served as director-general of public security and from 1930 until his death as minister of education.

Work 

Mosi's poetry contains mainly themes of patriotism and love. Most of his works were published between 1900 and 1925. His works include:

Këngat Shqipe, Thessaloniki, 1909.
Zan' i Atdheut, Trieste, 1913.

Sources 

1885 births
1933 deaths
Albanian writers
Albanian Roman Catholics
People from Shkodër
Government ministers of Albania
Public Works ministers of Albania
Police directors of Albania
Expatriates from the Ottoman Empire in the Austro-Hungarian Empire